Benjamin Babock Thurston (June 29, 1804 – May 17, 1886) was a U.S. Representative from Rhode Island.

Born in Hopkinton, Rhode Island, Thurston attended the common schools, and later engaged in mercantile pursuits.  He served as member of the Rhode Island House of Representatives 1831-1837, and as Lieutenant Governor of Rhode Island from 1837 to 1838 serving under Governor John B. Francis.

Thurston was elected as a Democrat to the Thirtieth Congress (March 4, 1847 – March 3, 1849).  He was an unsuccessful candidate for reelection in 1849 to the Thirty-first Congress.

Thurston was elected as a Democrat to the Thirty-second and Thirty-third Congresses and as a candidate of the American Party to the Thirty-fourth Congress (March 4, 1851 – March 3, 1857).  He served as chairman of the Committee on Expenditures in the Department of the Treasury (Thirty-second Congress), Committee on Patents (Thirty-third Congress), Committee on Accounts (Thirty-fourth Congress).  He was not a candidate for renomination in 1857.

After leaving Congress, Thurston moved to New London, Connecticut, where he served as member of the board of aldermen in 1862 and 1863.  He served as member of the Connecticut House of Representatives in 1869 and 1870.  He resumed mercantile pursuits.  He died in New London, Connecticut, May 17, 1886.  He was interred in Cedar Grove Cemetery.

Sources

1804 births
1886 deaths
People from Hopkinton, Rhode Island
Democratic Party members of the Rhode Island House of Representatives
Democratic Party members of the Connecticut House of Representatives
Lieutenant Governors of Rhode Island
Politicians from New London, Connecticut
Democratic Party members of the United States House of Representatives from Rhode Island
Rhode Island Know Nothings
Know-Nothing members of the United States House of Representatives from Rhode Island
19th-century American politicians